Der Lehrer (The Teacher) is a German television series. It premiered on 10 August 2009 on RTL Television. The first season consisted of 9 episodes, the second of 7. It premiered in December 2013.

On April 8, 2021, the series ended after 9 seasons and 98 episodes on RTL. RTL then announced that there would be no 10th season and canceled the series.

Premise 
Der Lehrer revolves around the teacher Stefan Vollmer (Hendrik Duryn) who teaches German, Science and PE. After 10 years he comes back to be a teacher again. His new school turns out to be very problematic with students hanging around in the halls and not listening to teachers. Vollmer becomes expert for the so-called "G-Kurs" which is the most chaotic class in the school. With new and unconventional methods he finally succeeds to come through to his students and change their attitude against school.

Cast 

guest actors

The show could already engage several known actors for guest roles. Frederick Lau as Picko in the third episode of season 1. Also Anna Stieblich, Marie Rönnebeck, Esther Esche, Yvonne de Bark, Sonja Baum, Guido Renner, Markus Hoffmann, Jannik Schümann, Sotiria Loucopoulos, Almila Bagriacik, Xenia Georgia Assenza, Nick Julius Schuk, Lion Wasczyk, Claudia Mehnert, Nick Romeo Reimann, Marvin Linke, Kathrin Ackermann and MoTrip in one or more episodes.

Production 
The series has already been produced in 2007 but aired two years  later due to lack of interest of the audience. It aired from 10 August to 31 August 2009, Mondays 9:15pm, with two episodes back-to-back. The sixth episode aired on 25 November 2009 in the night 4:25am (graveyard slot).

2011, RTL decided to continue the show as one hour series. The new season was filmed from April to August 2012. Jessica Ginkel and Matthias Klimsa joined the cast. The second season was originally planned to air in the 2012-13 television season. However, the start date has been pulled back to 5 December 2013.

Reception 
Der Lehrer won a Deutscher Fernsehpreis (German Television Award) in 2009 in the category “Beste Serie” (“best TV series”).

Episodes

Season 1 (2009)

Season 2 (2013-14)

Season 3 (2015)

Season 4 (2016)

Season 5 (2017)

Season 6 (2018)

Season 7 (2018-2019)

Season 8 (2019-2020)

Season 9 (2020-2021)

See also
List of German television series

External links
 
 Official website

References 

German comedy television series
2009 German television series debuts
2014 German television series endings
RTL (German TV channel) original programming
German-language television shows
Television series about educators